Gary Steven Burley (born December 8, 1952) is a former American football player who played as a defensive end for the Cincinnati Bengals and Atlanta Falcons of the National Football League.

He played for the Cincinnati Bengals from 1976-1983, and the Atlanta Falcons in 1984.

Early life
Gary Burley graduated from Grove City High School in Grove City, Ohio, near Columbus, in 1971.

College career
After high school, Burley played football in 1971 and 1972 at Wharton County Junior College in Wharton, Texas. Burley was offered a scholarship to the University of Pittsburgh, where he was named a first-team All-American in 1974.

Pro career
Burley was drafted by the Bengals in the third round (55th overall) of the 1975 NFL Draft. He was named to the 1976 NFL All-Rookie Team. He played in Super Bowl XVI in 1982, with the Bengals losing 26-21 to the San Francisco 49ers. In 8 seasons with Cincinnati, he played in 117 games, started 67, including all but 3 games his first 4 seasons.

His 9th and final NFL season was with the Atlanta Falcons, playing 12 games, starting 8.

After football
In 2006, Burley founded the Pro Start Academy, a Birmingham, Alabama-based organization that "mentors young athletes and provides tips on how they can achieve success on and off the football field".

Personal life
Between 2011 and 2015, Burley survived life-threatening ailments including cancer, a bone marrow transplant, the loss of a kidney—after 3 years of dialysis he received a kidney transplant and became an advocate for organ donations—and a bout of salmonella poisoning in his knee that put him in a wheelchair for six months. His wife's name is Bobbie Knight, a longtime Alabama Power executive. They reside in Birmingham, Alabama.

He hosts the Gary Burley Charity Golf Tournament at Greystone Country Club to benefit cancer research.

References

1952 births
American football defensive linemen
Living people
Cincinnati Bengals players
Atlanta Falcons players
Pittsburgh Panthers football players
Players of American football from Columbus, Ohio